Julie Gail Towers  (born 12 October 1976 in Taree, New South Wales) is an Australian field hockey player. She was born in New South Wales. She won a gold medal at the 2000 Summer Olympics in Sydney.

Towers competed in the Gladiator Team Sports Challenge in 1995.

References

External links

1976 births
Living people
People from New South Wales
Australian female field hockey players
Olympic field hockey players of Australia
Field hockey players at the 2000 Summer Olympics
Field hockey players at the 2004 Summer Olympics
Olympic gold medalists for Australia
Olympic medalists in field hockey
Medalists at the 2000 Summer Olympics
Commonwealth Games medallists in field hockey
Commonwealth Games bronze medallists for Australia
Field hockey players at the 2002 Commonwealth Games
Recipients of the Medal of the Order of Australia
Australian twins
Twin sportspeople
Medallists at the 2002 Commonwealth Games